Rudolf "Rudi" Seliger (born 20 September 1951) is a former football striker.

References

External links
 

Living people
1951 births
Sportspeople from Mülheim
German footballers
Germany international footballers
Germany B international footballers
Footballers at the 1972 Summer Olympics
Olympic footballers of West Germany
West German footballers
Association football forwards
MSV Duisburg players
Bundesliga players
2. Bundesliga players
Footballers from North Rhine-Westphalia